Priyadasi, also Piyadasi or Priyadarshi (Brahmi: 𑀧𑀺𑀬𑀤𑀲𑀺 piyadasi, Kharosthi: 𐡐𐡓𐡉𐡃𐡓𐡔 Prydrš), was the name of a ruler in ancient India, or simply an honorific epithet which means "He who regards others with kindness", "Humane", "He would glances amiably".

The title "Priyadasi" appears repeatedly in the ancient inscriptions known as the Major Rock Edicts or the Major Pillar Edicts, where it is generally used in conjunction with the title "Devanampriya" ("Beloved of the Gods") in the formula "Devanampriya Priyadasi". Some of the inscriptions rather use the title "Rajan Priyadasi" ("King Priyadarsi"). It also appears in Greek in the Kandahar Bilingual Rock Inscription (c. 260 BCE), when naming the author of the proclamation as βασι[λ]εὺς Πιοδασσης ("Basileus Piodassēs"), and in Aramaic in the same inscription as "our lord, king Priyadasin" (Kharosthi: 𐡐𐡓𐡉𐡃𐡓𐡔, Modern Hebrew:  pryd’rš).

According to Christopher Beckwith, "Priyadasi" could simply be the proper name of an early Indian king, author of the Major Rock Edicts or the Major Pillar Edicts inscriptions, whom he identifies as probably the son of Chandragupta Maurya, otherwise known in Greek source as Amitocrates.

Prinsep had originally identified Priyadasi with the King of Ceylon Devanampiya Tissa. However, in 1837, George Turnour discovered a Siamese version of the Sri Lankan manuscript Dipavamsa, or "Island Chronicle", associating Piyadasi with the early Maurya dynasty:

It was then supposed that this Priyadasi, being a Mauryan, was probably the Ashoka of Buddhist accounts. Because of the association in the Dipavamsa, the title "Priyadasi" is thought to have been used by the Indian Emperor Ashoka (r.269-233 BCE) in his inscriptions (the Edicts of Ashoka).

In inscriptions, the title "Priyadarsin" is often associated with the title "Devanampriya" ("Beloved of the Gods"). Separately, the title also appears in "Devanampriya" in conjunction with the name "Ashoka"  as in the Minor Rock Edict inscription discovered in Maski, associating Ashoka with Devanampriya:

References

Edicts of Ashoka